Gerard Croiset born Gerard Boekbinder (March 10, 1909July 20, 1980) was a Dutch parapsychologist, psychometrist and psychic. He was often asked to help police detectives trace missing persons, though authenticated successes were few, and compared against the failures, his success rate was ruled no better than chance.

Biography
Croiset was born in Laren, North Holland, in March 1909. He said he began to become aware of his gifts while a youth working for a watch repairer, and that on one occasion he held a ruler belonging to his employer and saw events which he related to his employer and which his employer confirmed were accurate.

Early work
After World War II, Croiset was sometimes consulted by Dutch police authorities for cases involving missing persons, or murder. On one occasion he was said to have examined the property of a murdered woman, and provided accurate information relating to her murder, and also gave the name of her murderer. The name matched a man who was being held in connection with the crime. He gained a reputation as a reliable consultant in the area of missing persons, and his fame extended beyond the Netherlands, as anecdotes about his abilities came to be discussed in other countries.  He also gained a reputation as a psychic healer, and would allow people to visit him in his clinic for healing sessions.

Missing persons cases
In 1966, he was invited to Australia to aid in an investigation relating to the disappearance of the three Beaumont children, who had disappeared without trace from a beach in Adelaide, South Australia. Although police were skeptical, his expenses were paid by the wealthy property tycoon Con Polites, who was interested in the case, and publicity was such that Croiset's ideas were thought to be worthy of consideration. During his brief stay in Australia, he attracted widespread publicity but failed to find any trace of the missing children.

In January 1970, Croiset participated in the investigation of the kidnapping of Muriel McKay, the wife of publishing tycoon Rupert Murdoch's Deputy Chairman Alick McKay. Croiset was asked by a McKay family friend, Eric Cutler, to help locate her. Croiset said that she was in a white farmhouse in the north or north-east of London, and that nearby to her was another farm and an abandoned aerodrome. He claimed that if she was not found within 14 days she would be dead. Her body was never found. Brothers Arthur and Nazimoodeen Hosein were convicted of her murder—the first case in British history of a murder conviction without a body. In 1978, the Chief Constable of Devon and Cornwall Police hired Croiset to investigate the disappearance of Genette Tate, but he provided no information of value.

Croiset died in Utrecht in 1980, aged 71.

Evaluation
Croiset claimed he helped to solve the case of an assault of a girl in Wierden, the Netherlands. The Chief of Police of Wierden stated however, that the information by Croiset was inaccurate and his communications were not used in the case. He was investigated under controlled conditions by The Belgian Committee for the Scientific Investigation of Phenomena Reputed to be Paranormal and they did not find any evidence of psychic ability.

The skeptic James Lett has written:

The Dutch parapsychologist  has written Croiset had genuine psychic powers due to the information he had given in police cases. However it was discovered that much of Tenhaeff's data was fraudulent.

See also
 Con artist
 Confidence trick
 Fortune telling fraud
 Houdini's debunking of psychics and mediums
 Ann O'Delia Diss Debar
 Televangelist Peter Popoff exposed by James Randi
 Bob Nygaard

References

External links

 Boekbinder, Gerard (1909–1980) Dutch language entry in scholarly biographical dictionary

1909 births
1980 deaths
Dutch Jews
Dutch psychics
Parapsychologists
People from Laren, North Holland
Spiritualists